Non-Stop is a 1958 science fiction novel by British writer Brian Aldiss. It is about problems that the inhabitants of a huge generation space ship face after an alien amino acid that they picked up on another planet triggers a pandemic. Law and order began to collapse, and knowledge of the ship and its purpose was eventually almost entirely lost throughout the vessel.

It was the author's first Science Fiction novel. Originally published by Faber & Faber, it was published in the U.S. by Criterion Books as Starship in 1959.  The novel has been frequently republished in the UK and US and translated into French, German, Danish and other languages. The Signet and Avon US paperback editions were also published under the title Starship, but American publishers Carroll & Graf and Overlook Press have used the title Non-Stop.

Plot summary

The novel's protagonist, Roy Complain, lives in a culturally-primitive tribe on a massive generation ship which has descended into a uncivilized state. The ship is overgrown by vegetation and the inhabitants have clustered into warring tribes. In Roy's tribe, curiosity is discouraged, and life is solitary, poor, and short. With a small group, he leaves his home and ventures into uncharted territory in the ship. The consequent discoveries will change his perception of the entire universe.

Complain's small tribe roam nomadically through corridors overrun by vegetation. After his wife is kidnapped, a tribal priest, Marapper, encourages Complain to join a furtive expedition into the unexplored corridors. It is Marapper's belief that they are all living on board a moving spacecraft and that if they can reach the control room, they will gain command of the entire gargantuan vessel.

On their journey, the group encounters other tribes of varying levels of sophistication. Complain is also briefly captured by humanoid 'Giants' of legend, who release him with no explanation. Complain's party eventually join the more sophisticated society of the 'Forwards'. Here, they learn that the space-craft is a multi-generational starship returning from a newly colonised planet in the Procyon star system. In a previous generation, the ship's inhabitants had suffered from a pandemic because of an alien amino acid found in the waters of the Procyon planet. Law and order began to collapse, and knowledge of the ship and its purpose was eventually almost entirely lost throughout the vessel. Since the 'Catastrophe', 23 generations have passed so far.

The Forwards have uncertain knowledge of 'Giants', who, though feared, are generally considered to be benevolent. Other mysterious beings, 'Outsiders', are thought to infiltrate the human world from an unknown place and are reviled as enemies. However, when the Giants attack a Forward crew-member, the humans conclude that the Giants and Outsiders are colluding against humanity and prepare to retaliate in force. Meanwhile, Complain and his developing romantic interest Vyann (a Forward officer) learn that the spacecraft should have taken only six generations to return to Earth. Aware that 23 generations have passed since the epidemic, they despairingly deduce that the entire spacecraft is now plummeting into the cold expanse of infinite space. Although they find the ship's control centre, all of its mechanisms have been destroyed.

The Forwards briefly engage the Giants, but the conflict quickly ends. It is then revealed that the ship has been moored outside Earth's atmosphere for a number of years. The 'Giants' are merely normal-sized Earth-humans who have been attempting to improve the conditions of the ship's inhabitants by slowly repairing the vessel. The 'Outsiders' are unusually short humans from Earth who have infiltrated the ship's various societies to study the development of their civilization.

The rulers of Earth have been reluctant to integrate the ship-dwellers into Earth's civilization because the epidemic survivors have mutated to live four times faster than Earth's population. However, the recent battle on board the spacecraft has caused it to begin an emergency split into its composite parts, ensuring that the entire population will now be granted a new start on Earth.

Reception
Galaxy reviewer Floyd C. Gale gave the novel a mixed review, rating the book 3 1/2 stars out of five and faulting "the shock ending [which] is abrupt and leaves so much unanswered". He later compared the book's "impact to Tumithak".

In 2000, the book was re-published as part of the SF Masterworks series.  This edition contained some minor revisions by the author.

In 2008 the book was retrospectively awarded the British Science Fiction Association Award for best novel of 1958.

See also 
 Generation ship
 Orphans of the Sky by Robert A. Heinlein
 Captive Universe by Harry Harrison
 Metamorphosis Alpha, a role-playing game with many similar elements.
 The Starlost, Canadian television series about a generation ship.
 Pandorum, a movie directed by Christian Alvart, with somewhat similar themes.

References

External links
Page on Brian Aldiss's official website
Internet Book List
Generic Discontinuities in SF: Brian Aldiss' Starship

1958 British novels
British science fiction novels
1958 science fiction novels
Novels by Brian Aldiss
Generation ships in fiction
Faber and Faber books
Fiction set around Procyon
1958 debut novels